HMS Ariadne was a 20-gun  sixth-rate post ship built for the Royal Navy during the 1810s. The vessel was completed in 1816, modified in the early 1820s and only entered service in 1823. Ariadne was assigned to the Cape of Good Hope Station, followed by a stint in the Mediterranean Sea. The post ship was taken out of service in 1828, turned into a coal hulk and sold for scrap in 1841.

Description
The ship's tonnage was 511  tons burthen. Ariadne was armed with initially eighteen, later twenty-four, 32-pounder carronades on her gundeck and a pair of 9-pounder cannon as chase guns. The ship had a crew of 135 officers and ratings.

Construction and career

Ariadne, the third ship of her name to serve in the Royal Navy, was ordered on 28 November 1812, laid down on April 1815 in Pater Dockyard, Wales, and launched, together with her sister ship, on 10 February 1816 by John Campbell, Lord Cawdor. She was completed on 21 March 1816 and placed in ordinary. Ariadne cost £11,936 to built and a further £3,579 to fit out. She was converted into a 26-gun post ship at Plymouth Dockyard in January–May 1820 by the addition of quarterdeck, with further six carronades, and forecastle to the original flush-deck construction, and fitted for sea in March–August 1822.

The ship's first commission began in April 1823 under the command of Captain Robert Moorsom. He was relieved by Captain Isaac Chapman in December 1824 and Ariadne was assigned to the Cape of Good Hope Station. Chapman was court-martialed and dismissed from the service in June 1826 for having purchased a female slave and brought her aboard, but he had been relieved by Captain Lord Adolphus Fitzclarence earlier in February, by which time the ship was assigned to the Mediterranean Fleet. She was decommissioned at its end in May 1828.

Notes

References
 
 
 
 

 

Hermes-class post ships
1816 ships
Ships built in Pembroke Dock